Oglesby is a city in LaSalle County, Illinois, United States. The population was 3,712 at the 2020 census, down from 3,791 at the 2010 census. It is part of the Ottawa Micropolitan Statistical Area.

History
Oglesby was a center for mining coal, limestone, and silica, located near the confluence of the Illinois River and the north-flowing Vermilion River. Oglesby grew from an amalgamation of several mining villages, such as Kenosha, Portland, and Black Hollow. It was originally called Portland, due to the cement mined and manufactured in the area that was similar to Portland Cement from England. It was renamed in 1913 after the coal company and in honor of Richard J. Oglesby (1824–1899), a former U.S. Senator and three-time Governor of Illinois.

During the Civil War, the Kenosha Coal Company sank a coal mining shaft at Oglesby in 1865. Thatcher Tucker Bent purchased the mine and mineral rights as the Oglesby Coal Company. The mine was innovative and the Bents were very involved in the development of the community. Mrs. Josephine Bent even organized English classes for the immigrant miner's wives. The Marquette Cement Company mined limestone and claimed that the Bent's mine was causing collapses. The conflict eventually liquidated the Oglesby Coal Company, with the Bent selling the machinery to Marquette and auctioning off the farm animals. The Black Hollow Mine was dug in the 1890s as a slope mine along the Vermilion River. It provided coal to its owners, the Illinois Zinc Company in Peru, Illinois.

The surface ground layers around Oglesby had excellent exposed limestone and coal; Oglesby also had adequate riverine transport. It soon became an important center for cement manufacture. Before open-pit mining there were several subsurface cement mines:

Illinois Clay Products Mine, 1913–1924
Reynolds Clay Mine
Marquette Cement Mine

As well as several coal mines:

Jones Mine, 1865–1930
Oglesby Mine, 1865–1919
Deer Park Mine, 1900–1920
Black Hollow Mine, circa 1890s

State parks
Matthiessen State Park and Starved Rock State Park are located a few miles east on Illinois State Route 178. With over two million visitors a year, Starved Rock is the most visited of any Illinois state park.

Geography
Oglesby is located at  (41.296762, -89.066074).

Demographics

As of the census of 2020, there were 3,712 people, 1,522 households, and 1,035 families residing in the city. The racial makeup of the city was 90.24% White, 0.46% African American, 0.38% Native American, 0.67% Asian, 1.62% from other races, and 6.63% from two or more races. Hispanic or Latino of any race were 8.19% of the population.

There were 1,522 households, of which 33.0% had children under the age of 18 living with them, 48.9% were married couples living together, 12.2% had a female householder with no husband present, and 32.0% were non-families. 25.6% of all households were made up of individuals, and 10.9% had someone living alone who was 65 years of age or older. The average household size was 2.40 and the average family size was 2.90.

In the city the population consisted of 24.1% under the age of 18, 4.4% from 18 to 24, 26.3% from 25 to 44, 26.1% from 45 to 64, and 19.1% who were 65 years of age or older. The median age was 40.7 years. For every 100 females, there were 106.2 males. For every 100 females age 18 and over, there were 95.3 males.

The median income for a household in the city was $61,250, and the median income for a family was $70,260. Males had a median income of $51,642 versus $28,393 for females. The per capita income for the city was $29,569. About 4.7% of families and 6.3% of the population were below the poverty line, including 18.3% of those under age 18 and 5.3% of those age 65 or over.

Education
Oglesby Lincoln School, Oglesby Washington School, Holy Family parochial School, and Illinois Valley Community College are located in Oglesby.

Arts and culture
Murals were produced in the United States through the Section of Painting and Sculpture, later called the Section of Fine Arts, of the Treasury Department from 1934 to 1943. They were intended to boost the morale of the American people suffering from the effects of the Depression by depicting uplifting subjects. In 1942 artist Fay E. Davis 
painted an oil on canvas mural titled The Illini and Potawatomes Struggles at Starved Rock in the town's post office. The mural's muted earth tones faded badly over time and it was restored in 1988. In 1993 a post office janitor complained about the nudity of the features of the Native Americans depicted in the mural. The painting was covered by a venetian blind and only revealed upon request. A successful petition drive to remove the blinds was begun soon after.

Notable people

 Jim Bottomley, first baseman for the St. Louis Cardinals, Cincinnati Reds and St. Louis Browns
 Frank Lamanske, pitcher for the Brooklyn Dodgers
 Bo Molenda, fullback (and later coach) for the Green Bay Packers and New York Giants; born in Oglesby
 Walt Tauscher, pitcher for the Pittsburgh Pirates and Washington Senators

References

Cities in LaSalle County, Illinois
Cities in Illinois
Ottawa, IL Micropolitan Statistical Area